The Man in the Mirror (German: Der Mann im Spiegel) is a 1917 German silent drama film directed by Robert Wiene and starring Maria Fein, Bruno Decarli and Emil Rameau.

Plot 
A man seeks revenge on a prince who seduced his sister, and ends up killing him.

Cast 
 Maria Fein   
 Bruno Decarli   
 Emil Rameau 
 Alexander Antalffy

References

Bibliography 
 Jung, Uli & Schatzberg, Walter. Beyond Caligari: The Films of Robert Wiene. Berghahn Books, 1999.

External links 

1917 films
Films of the German Empire
German silent feature films
German drama films
Films directed by Robert Wiene
1917 drama films
German black-and-white films
Silent drama films
1910s German films